Shopska salad (Bulgarian, Macedonian and Serbian: Шопска салата; ; ; ; ; ;) is a cold salad popular throughout Southeastern Europe. This is Bulgaria's most famous dish and national salad, whose colors recall the Bulgarian flag.

Recipe 
It is made from tomatoes, cucumbers, onion/scallions, raw or roasted peppers, sirene (white brine cheese), and parsley. The vegetables are usually diced and salted, followed by a light dressing of sunflower oil (or olive oil, which is less authentic), which is occasionally complemented by vinegar. The addition of vinegar contributes, however, to the sour flavour that the tomatoes impart. In restaurants, the dressings are provided separately. Lastly, the vegetables are covered in a thick layer of grated or diced sirene cheese. This salad is often consumed as an appetizer with rakia.

History

Balkantourist invention 
For the first time the term "Shopska salad" is used in a Bulgarian cookbook from 1940. It was actually utilized for a recipe of some kind of lyutenitsa, and has nothing to do with the subsequent use of this designation. The salad was created as a culinary product in the state tourist association "Balkantourist" in 1955. Despite the salad's name comes from westernmost Bulgarian region called Shopluk, in fact, it was invented in its easternmost region. The salad appeared at the Black Sea coast, in a resort near Varna, called Druzhba. It can be found in one of the first state-approved repertoires from 1956 (Sbornik recepti 1956, vol. 1, p. 50).  The development and popularization of the salad is attributed to the doyen of Bulgarian tourism Petar Doychev (1924-2019). It is a product of early socialism in Bulgaria, and part of tourist promotion, the only survivor of five or six similar recipes. At the time, leading chefs from Balkantourist invented Dobrujan, Macedonian, Thracian and several other salads with similar names, which were associated with different ethnographical regions. It turns out that only the Shopska salad survived. The ingredients used were chosen in part because they resemble the three colors of the Bulgarian flag, and thus would evoke a national sentiment. The salad has become initially an emblem of the Bulgarian tourism. It was approved as a national culinary symbol during the 1970s and 1980s. In 2014 Shopska salad turned out to be Bulgaria's most recognizable dish in Europe. It was the most popular recipe in a European Parliament initiative called A Taste of Europe.

Origin dispute 
From Bulgaria, the recipe spread to the cuisine of neighboring countries. Because the area of Shopluk is divided among Bulgaria, Serbia and North Macedonia,  after the breakup of Yugoslavia chefs there began to contest the Bulgarian origin of the salad. It is claimed as a local product even in Croatia. Though, Miroslav Stefanović (Maystor Miro), a four-time Serbian gastronomy chef champion, who owns the most popular chain Serbian restaurants in Bulgaria, is adamant that the Shopska salad is Bulgarian. Also it is widespread in Romania under the name Bulgarian salad.

See also 
 Çoban salatası, a similar salad in Turkish cuisine
 Greek salad, a similar salad in Greek cuisine
 Israeli salad
 Kachumber
 Serbian salad
 Shirazi salad
 List of salads

References

Salads
Bulgarian cuisine
Appetizers
Balkan cuisine